Eirinoupoli is a former municipality in Imathia, Central Macedonia, Greece. Since the 2011 local government reform it is part of the municipality Naousa, of which it is a municipal unit. The municipal unit has an area of 49.962 km2. Population 3,808 (2011). It has 5 villages (Angelochori, Ano Zervochori, Kato Zervochori, Polyplatanos and Archangelos).

References 

Populated places in Imathia